The Fellowship of the British Academy consists of world-leading scholars and researchers in the humanities and social sciences. A number of fellows are elected each year in July at the Academy's annual general meeting.

2009 

The following fellows of the British Academy were elected at the annual general meeting in 2009:

 Professor Simon Baron-Cohen. Professor of Developmental Psychopathology; Director, Autism Research Centre, University of Cambridge
 Professor William Beinart. Rhodes Professor of Race Relations, University of Oxford; Professorial Fellow, St Antony's College 
 Professor Martin Bell. Professor of Archaeology, University of Reading
 Robin Briggs. Senior Research Fellow, All Souls College, University of Oxford
 Professor Bruce Campbell. Professor of Medieval Economic History, Queen's University, Belfast
 Professor Christine Chinkin. Professor of International Law, London School of Economics
 Professor Paul Cloke. Professor of Human Geography, University of Exeter
 Dr Jean Dunbabin. Senior Research Fellow, St Anne's College, University of Oxford
 Professor John Duncan. Assistant Director, MRC Cognition and Brain Sciences Unit, Cambridge
 Professor Richard English. Professor of Politics, Queen's University, Belfast
 Professor Philip Ford. Professor of French and Neo-Latin Literature, University of Cambridge
 Professor Michael D. Freeman. Professor of English Law, University College London
 Professor Graham Furniss. Professor of African Language Literature, School of Oriental and African Studies, University of London
 Professor Malcolm Godden. Rawlinson and Bosworth Professor of Anglo-Saxon, University of Oxford
 Professor Rachel Griffith. Deputy Research Director, Institute for Fiscal Studies; professor of economics, University College London
 Professor Peter Hammond. Marie Curie Professor, Department of Economics, University of Warwick
 Professor Colin Haselgrove. Professor of Archaeology and Head of School of Archaeology and Ancient History, University of Leicester
 Professor Jonathan Haslam. Professor of the History of International Relations, University of Cambridge
 Professor Patsy Healey. Professor Emeritus, School of Architecture, Planning and Landscape, Newcastle University
 Dr Wilfrid Hodges. Formerly Professor of Mathematics, Queen Mary, University of London
 Professor Glyn Humphreys. Professor of Cognitive Psychology, University of Birmingham
 Professor Mary Jacobus. Professor of English and Director, Centre for Research in the Arts, Social Sciences, and Humanities, University of Cambridge
 Professor Ruth Lister. Professor of Social Policy, Loughborough University
 Professor John Mack. Professor of World Art Studies, University of East Anglia
 Dr John Marenbon. Senior Research Fellow, Trinity College, Cambridge
 Professor Roger Pearson. Professor of French, University of Oxford; Fellow and Praelector, The Queen's College 
 Professor Christopher Pelling. Regius Professor of Greek, University of Oxford
 Professor Geoffrey Pullum. Professor of General Linguistics and Head of Linguistics and English Language, The University of Edinburgh
 Professor Susan Rankin. Professor of Medieval Music, University of Cambridge; Fellow, Emmanuel College 
 Professor Michael Silk. Professor of Classical and Comparative Literature, King's College London
 Professor David M. Smith. Emeritus Professor of Geography, Queen Mary, University of London
 Professor Margaret J. Snowling. Professor of Psychology, University of York
 Professor Fiona Steele. Professor of Social Statistics, University of Bristol
 Professor Peter Taylor-Gooby. Professor of Social Policy, University of Kent; Honorary Co-Director, Risk Research Centre, Beijing Normal University
 Professor Alexandra Walsham. Professor of Reformation History, University of Exeter
 Professor Reg Ward. Formerly Professor of Modern History, University of Durham
 Professor David Womersley. Thomas Warton Professor of English Literature, University of Oxford
 Professor Sarah Worthington. Pro-Director and professor of law, London School of Economics

2008 

The following fellows of the British Academy were elected at the annual general meeting in 2008:

 Professor Sara Arber, professor of sociology, University of Surrey; Co-Director, Centre for Research on Ageing and Gender
 Professor Alan Baddeley, CBE, FRS, professor of psychology, University of York
 Professor Michael Bell, professor of English and Comparative Literary Studies, University of Warwick
 Professor John Blair, professor of Medieval History and Archaeology, University of Oxford; Fellow and Praelector, The Queen's College
 Professor Martin Browning, professor of economics, University of Oxford; Fellow, Nuffield College
 Professor Harald Clahsen, professor of linguistics, University of Essex
 Professor Trevor J. Dadson, professor of Hispanic Studies and vice-principal (Humanities and Social Sciences), Queen Mary, University of London
 Professor Jon Driver, FMedSci, Director, Institute of Cognitive Neuroscience, University College London
 Professor David Firth, professor of statistics, University of Warwick
 Professor Chris Frith, FRS, emeritus professor of Neuropsychology, Wellcome Trust Centre for Neuroimaging, University College London; Niels Bohr Visiting Professor, University of Aarhus
 Professor Roberta Gilchrist, professor of archaeology, University of Reading
 Professor Robert Hillenbrand, professor emeritus, History of Art, University of Edinburgh
 Professor Colin Jones, professor of history, Queen Mary, University of London
 Professor Oliver B. Linton, professor of Econometrics, London School of Economics
 Professor Julius Lipner, professor of Hinduism and the Comparative Study of Religion, University of Cambridge
 Professor Ruth Mace, professor of Evolutionary Anthropology, University College London
 Professor Christopher McCrudden, professor of Human Rights Law, University of Oxford; Fellow, Lincoln College
 Professor Linda McDowell, professor of Human Geography, University of Oxford; Fellow, St John's College
 Professor Iain McLean, professor of politics, University of Oxford; Official Fellow in Politics, Nuffield College
 Professor Hugh McLeod, professor of Church History, University of Birmingham
 Professor Daniel Miller, professor of Anthropology, University College London
 Professor Peter Neary, professor of economics, University of Oxford; Fellow, Merton College
 Professor Vivian Nutton, professor of the History of Medicine, University College London
 Professor Stephen Oakley, Kennedy Professor of Latin, University of Cambridge
 Professor Michael O'Brien, professor of American Intellectual History, University of Cambridge; Fellow, Jesus College
 Professor Ray Pahl, Visiting Research Professor, University of Essex; professor emeritus of Sociology, University of Kent
 Professor Roger Parker, Thurston Dart Professor of Music, King's College London
 Professor Kenneth Reid, CBE, FRSE, WS, professor of Property Law, University of Edinburgh
 Professor Martin J. S. Rudwick, Affiliated Research Scholar, History and Philosophy of Science, University of Cambridge; professor emeritus of History, University of California, San Diego
 Professor Roger Scruton, senior research fellow, Blackfriars Hall; Research Professor, Institute for the Psychological Sciences, Arlington, Virginia
 Professor Vivienne Shue, professor and Director, Contemporary China Studies, University of Oxford
 Professor Paul Julian Smith, professor of Spanish, University of Cambridge
 Professor Susan J. Smith, professor of Geography and Director of the Institute of Advanced Study, Durham University
 Professor Lisa Tickner, professor emerita of Art History, Middlesex University; visiting professor, Courtauld Institute of Art, University of London
 Professor John Tiley, professor of the Law of Taxation, University of Cambridge; Fellow, Queens’ College
 Professor Charles Townshend, professor of International History, Keele University
 Professor Tony Wilkinson, professor of archaeology, Durham University
 Professor Mark Williams, professor of Clinical Psychology and Wellcome Principal Research Fellow, University of Oxford

2007 

The following fellows of the British Academy were elected at the annual general meeting in 2007:

 Ash Amin, professor of Geography and executive director, Institute of Advanced Study, University of Durham
 Mark Armstrong, professor of economics, University College London
 Derek Attridge, professor of English, University of York
 Toby Barnard, lecturer in History, University of Oxford, Fellow of Hertford College
 John Barton, Oriel and Laing Professor of the Interpretation of Holy Scripture, University of Oxford
 Paul Binski, professor of the History of Medieval Art, University of Cambridge
 Rachel Bowlby, Northcliffe Professor of Modern English Literature, University College London
 Harvey Brown, professor of Philosophy of Physics, University of Oxford
 Andrew Burrows, Norton Rose Professor of Commercial Law, University of Oxford, Fellow of St Hugh's College
 Bryony Coles, professor of Prehistoric Archaeology, University of Exeter
 Ross Cranston, Centennial Professor of Law, London School of Economics and Political Science
 Robert Foley, Director of the Leverhulme Centre for Human Evolutionary Studies, University of Cambridge, Fellow of King's College
 Mary Fulbrook, professor of German History, University College London
 Christopher Fuller, professor of Anthropology, London School of Economics and Political Science
 John Gillingham, emeritus professor, London School of Economics and Political Science
 John Haffenden, Research Professor in English Literature, University of Sheffield
 Christopher Hill, Sir Patrick Sheehy Professor of International Relations, University of Cambridge
 Carole Hillenbrand, professor of Islamic History, University of Edinburgh
 Boyd Hilton, reader in Modern British History, University of Cambridge, Fellow of Trinity College
 Michael Hunter, professor of history, Birkbeck, University of London
 Catriona Kelly, professor of Russian and Co-Director, European Humanities Research Centre, University of Oxford
 Joni Lovenduski, Anniversary Professor of Politics, Birkbeck, University of London
 Richard McCabe, professor of English Language and Literature, University of Oxford, Fellow of Merton College
 David Martin, emeritus professor of sociology, London School of Economics and Political Science
 Henrietta Moore, professor of Social Anthropology, London School of Economics and Political Science
 Colin Morris, emeritus professor of Medieval History, University of Southampton
 Anthony Ogus, professor of law, University of Manchester
 Carole Pateman, Research Professor, European Studies, Cardiff University
 Nicholas Purcell, Fellow in Ancient History, St John's College, Oxford
 Genevra Richardson, professor of law, King's College London
 Ian Roberts, professor of linguistics, University of Cambridge
 Kevin Roberts, Sir John Hicks Professor of Economics, University of Oxford
 Mike Savage, professor of Sociology and Director of the ESRC Centre for Research in Socio-Cultural Change, University of Manchester
 John Scott, professor of sociology, University of Essex
 Richard Smith, professor of Econometric Theory and Economic Statistics, University of Cambridge
 Zara Steiner, emeritus fellow, New Hall, Cambridge
 Steven Tipper, professor of Cognitive Science, University of Wales, Bangor
 H. Peyton Young, Professorial Fellow, Nuffield College, Oxford; senior fellow, The Brookings Institution, Washington DC

2006 

The following fellows of the British Academy were elected at the annual general meeting in 2006:

 Professor Robert Adams (University of Oxford) Philosophy 
 Professor Stephen Ball (The Institute of Education, University of London) Sociology of Education
 Professor Dorothy Bishop (University of Oxford) Developmental Neuropsychology
 Professor Ken Booth (University of Wales) International Relations
 Professor John Butt (University of Glasgow) History of Music 
 Professor Richard Carwardine (University of Oxford) American History
 Professor Avshalom Caspi (King's College London, University of London) Social, Genetic and Developmental Psychiatry
 Professor John Child (University of Birmingham) Commerce
 Professor Hugh Collins (London School of Economics) Law
 Professor Helen Cooper (University of Cambridge) English Literature 
 Professor James Dunn (University of Durham) Theology & Religion
 Professor David Feldman (University of Cambridge) Law
 Professor Andrew George (School of Oriental and African Studies) Assyriology
 Dr Sudhir Hazareesingh (University of Oxford) Politics
 Professor Ray Hudson (University of Durham) Geography 
 Professor Michael Lipton (University of Sussex) Economics
 Professor Edna Longley (Queen's University Belfast) English Literature
 Professor Stephen Machin (University College London) Economics
 Professor Hector MacQueen (University of Edinburgh) Law
 Professor Martin Millett (University of Cambridge) Archaeology
 Professor Michael Moriarty (Queen Mary, University of London) French
 Professor Robin Osborne (University of Cambridge) Ancient History
 Professor Jacqueline Rose (Queen Mary, University of London) English Literature
 Professor Jill Rubery (University of Manchester) Economic Sociology 
 Rosalind Savill (The Wallace Collection) History of Art 
 Professor Hamish Scott (University of St Andrews) International History
 Professor Stephen Shennan (University College London) Archaeology
 Professor Neil Shephard (University of Oxford) Economics
 Professor Avi Shlaim (University of Oxford) International Relations
 Professor Paul Sillitoe (University of Durham) Anthropology 
 Professor Patricia Thane (Institute of Historical Research, University of London) Contemporary British History 
 Professor Edward Timms (University of Sussex) German Studies
 Professor Nigel Vincent (University of Manchester) Linguistics
 Professor Charles Withers (University of Edinburgh) Historical Geography

Senior fellows 

 Professor Rosemary Cramp (University of Durham) Archaeology 
 Professor Barbara Hardy (Birkbeck, University of London) English Literature 
 Professor Rudolf Klein (University of Bath) Social Policy

2005 
The following fellows of the British Academy were elected at the annual general meeting in 2005:

 Professor Philip Alexander (University of Manchester), Theology
 Professor Andrew Barker (University of Birmingham), Classics
 Dr Bonnie Blackburn, Musicology (Independent scholar)
 Professor Richard Britnell (University of Durham), History
 Professor Bernard Capp (University of Warwick), History
 Professor Gordon Clark (University of Oxford), Geography
 Professor Roger Cotterrell (Queen Mary, University of London), Law
 Professor Cairns Craig (University of Edinburgh), English Literature
 Professor Colin Crouch (University of Warwick), Sociology
 Professor David d'Avray (University College London), History
 Professor Simon Deakin (University of Cambridge), Law
 Professor Ian Diamond (Economic and Social Research Council), Sociology
 Professor Dorothy Edgington (University of Oxford), Philosophy
 Professor Sandra Fredman (University of Oxford), Law
 Professor Miriam Glucksmann (University of Essex), Sociology
 Professor Christopher Gosden (University of Oxford), Archaeology
 Professor Sir Brian Harrison (University of Oxford), History 
 Professor Jo Labanyi (University of Southampton), Spanish Literature
 Professor Andrew Linklater (University of Wales, Aberystwyth), Political Studies
 Professor David McCrone (University of Edinburgh), Sociology
 Professor April McMahon (University of Edinburgh), Linguistics
 Professor Ronald Martin (University of Cambridge), Geography
 Professor Costas Meghir (University College London), Economics
 Professor Dawn Oliver (University College London), Law
 Professor David Perrett (University of St Andrews), Psychology
 Professor Robert Plomin (Institute of Psychiatry, King's College London), Psychology
 Professor Graham Rees (Queen Mary, University of London), English Literature
 Professor David Reynolds (University of Cambridge), History
 Professor David Sanders (University of Essex), Political Studies
 Professor Geoffrey Searle (University of East Anglia), History
 Professor Hyun Song Shin (London School of Economics and Political Science), Economics
 Professor Nicholas Thomas (Goldsmiths College, University of London), Anthropology
 Professor Gerard van Gelder (University of Oxford), Oriental Studies
 Professor Anthony Venables (London School of Economics and Political Science), Economics
 Professor Marina Warner (University of Essex), English Literature

Senior fellows 

 Professor Sydney Anglo (formerly University of Swansea), History
 Professor Stuart Hall (Open University), Cultural Studies
 Professor Michael Zander (London School of Economics and Political Science), Law

2004 
The following fellows of the British Academy were elected at the annual general meeting in 2004:

 Professor P. Allott (University of Cambridge), Law
 Professor D. J. Arnold (School of Oriental and African Studies, University of London), History
 Professor O. Attanasio (University College London), Economics
 Professor H. G. Beale (University of Warwick; Law Commission), Law
 Professor J. A. Beckford (University of Warwick), Sociology
 Professor M. Berg (University of Warwick), History 
 Dr J. W. Binns (University of York), Literature
 Professor P. J. Bowler (Queen's University Belfast), History of Science
 Professor C. Clunas (School of Oriental and African Studies, University of London), History of Art
 Professor R. A. Duff (University of Stirling), Legal Philosophy
 Professor E. Duffy (University of Cambridge), History
 Professor R. O. Fardon (School of Oriental and African Studies, University of London), Anthropology
 Professor W. J. Hardcastle (Queen Margaret University College, Edinburgh), Linguistics
 Professor S. Hornblower (University College London), Classics
 Professor N. Jardine (University of Cambridge), History of Science
 Dr A. Jefferson (University of Oxford), French Literature 
 Professor S. Kay (University of Cambridge), French Literature
 Professor A. Kuhn (Lancaster University), Film Studies 
 Professor J. E. Lewis (University of Oxford), Sociology 
 Professor D. A. MacKenzie (University of Edinburgh), Sociology
 Professor S. Mendus (University of York), Political Studies
 Professor R. Middleton (University of Newcastle upon Tyne), Musicology
 Professor S. J. Mithen (University of Reading), Archaeology
 Professor T. E. Moffitt (Institute of Psychiatry, King's College London), Psychology
 Professor M. Moran (University of Manchester), Political Studies
 Dr S. C. Ogilvie (University of Cambridge), Economic History 
 Professor R. D. Portes (London Business School), Economics
 Mr J. D. Ray (University of Cambridge), Egyptology
 Professor R. Robertson (University of Oxford), German Literature
 Professor P. Simons (University of Leeds), Philosophy
 Professor C. Skinner (University of Southampton), Social Statistics
 Professor J. A. Sloboda (Keele University), Psychology
 Professor P. J. Taylor (Loughborough University), Geography
 Professor D. Trotter (University of Cambridge), English Literature
 Professor F. M. Young (University of Birmingham), Theology

Senior fellows 
 Professor D. Harris (Institute of Archaeology, University College London), Geography 
 Dr J. L. Oates (University of Cambridge), Archaeology
 Professor P. B. Townsend (University of Bristol), Sociology

2003 
The following fellows of the British Academy were elected at the annual general meeting in 2003:

 Professor R. C. Allen (University of Oxford), Economic History
 Professor I. Armstrong (Birkbeck, University of London), Literature
 Professor K. Barber (University of Birmingham), African Studies
 Professor E. Boa (University of Nottingham), German Literature
 Professor S. J. Broadie (University of St Andrews), Philosophy
 Professor S. Bruce (University of Aberdeen), Sociology
 Dr A. M. Burnett (The British Museum), Classics
 Professor D. M. Clark (Institute of Psychiatry, London), Psychology
 Professor J. Cleland (London School of Hygiene and Tropical Medicine), Demography
 Dr J. E. Curtis (The British Museum), Archaeology
 Professor G. I. Davies (University of Cambridge), Theology
 Professor I. J. Deary (University of Edinburgh), Psychology
 Professor T. F. Eagleton (University of Manchester), Literature
 Professor R. F. Ellen (University of Kent at Canterbury), Anthropology
 Professor D. J. Hand (Imperial College London), Social Statistics
 Professor P. J. Hennessy (Queen Mary, University of London), History
 Professor B. A. Hepple (University of Cambridge), Law
 Professor L. Hill (University of Warwick), Literature
 Professor D. J. Ibbetson (University of Cambridge), Law
 Professor J. T. Jackson (University of Wales at Swansea), History
 Professor D. King (University of Oxford), Political Studies
 Professor N. Kiyotaki (London School of Economics and Political Science), Economics
 Professor Lord Layard (London School of Economics and Political Science), Economics
 Professor J. D. McClean (University of Sheffield), Law
 Professor M. D. Maiden (University of Oxford), Linguistics
 Professor D. J. Mattingly (University of Leicester), Archaeology
 Professor Lord Parekh (London School of Economics and Political Science), Political Studies
 Professor A. M. Pettigrew (University of Warwick), Business Studies
 Professor A. Phillips (London School of Economics and Political Science), Political Studies
 Professor T. Puttfarken (University of Essex), Art History
 Professor B. Richardson (University of Leeds), Italian Literature
 Professor N. A. M. Rodger (University of Exeter), History
 Professor R. Sharpe (University of Oxford), History
 Professor N. J. Thrift (University of Bristol), Geography
 Professor B. W. Vickers, elected to Corresponding Fellowship in 1998, was transferred to Ordinary Fellowship on becoming ordinarily resident in the UK.
 Professor R. I. Woods (University of Liverpool), Demography

Senior fellows 
 Professor G. Best, History
 Professor P. D. A. Harvey, History
 Professor E. Jones, Geography

2002 
The following fellows of the British Academy were elected at the annual general meeting in 2002:

 Professor S. W. Blackburn (University of Cambridge), Philosophy
 The Revd Canon Professor D. W. Brown (University of Durham), Theology
 Professor M. S. Butler (University of Oxford), English
 Professor B. Butterworth (University College London), Psychology
 Professor R. A. Dodgshon (University of Wales Aberystwyth), Geography
 Professor L. Dreyfus (King's College London), Musicology
 Professor M. Elliott (University of Liverpool), History
 Professor E. C. Fernie (Courtauld Institute of Art), History of Art
 Professor R. C. Floud (London Guildhall University), Economic History
 Professor M. R. Freedland (University of Oxford), Law
 Professor J. I. Gershuny (University of Essex), Sociology
 Professor H. Glennerster (London School of Economics and Political Science), Social Policy
 Professor F. Halliday (London School of Economics and Political Science), Political Science
 Professor P. F. Hammond (University of Leeds), English
 Dr M. R. C. Hewstone (University of Oxford), Psychology
 Professor J. R. Hills (London School of Economics and Political Science), Social Policy
 Professor C. D. Holes (University of Oxford), Arab studies
 Professor A. Hook (University of Glasgow), English
 Professor G. H. Jenkins (University of Wales Centre for Advanced Welsh and Celtic Studies), History
 Professor Sir Ian Kennedy (University College London), Law
 Dr P. A. Linehan (University of Cambridge), History
 Professor P. Magdalino (University of St Andrews), History
 Professor D. B. Massey (The Open University), Geography
 Dr D. Miller (University of Oxford), Political Science
 Professor Robin Milner-Gulland (University of Sussex), Russian Literature
 Professor S. Mitchell (University of Exeter), Classics
 Professor M. S. Morgan (London School of Economics and Political Science), Economic History
 Professor M. Murphy (London School of Economics and Political Science), Demography
 Professor D. W. Phillipson (University of Cambridge), Archaeology
 Professor C. A. Pissarides (London School of Economics and Political Science), Economics
 Dr O. Rackham (University of Cambridge), Ecological History
 Professor M. Steedman (University of Edinburgh), Linguistics
 Professor J. P. Thomas (University of St Andrews), Economics
 Professor M. Vaughan (University of Oxford), History of Africa
 Professor W. E. Yates (University of Exeter), Austrian literature

Senior fellows 
 Professor M. D. I. Chisholm, Economic geography
 Miss B. E. de Cardi, Archaeology
 Professor A. H. Williams, Economics

2001 
The following fellows of the British Academy were elected at the annual general meeting in 2001:

 Professor M. R. Ayers (University of Oxford), Philosophy
 Professor J. Barrell (University of York), English
 Professor J. M. Batty (University College London), Spatial Analysis
 Professor J. Beatson (University of Cambridge), Law
 Professor T. J. Besley (London School of Economics and Political Science), Economics
 Professor N. Boyle (University of Cambridge), German Literature
 Professor T. M. O. Charles-Edwards (University of Oxford), Celtic Studies
 Professor A. Chesher (University College London), Economics
 Professor N. Cook (University of Southampton), Music
 Professor T. P. Dyson (London School of Economics and Political Science), Demography
 Mr J. M. Eekelaar (University of Oxford), Law
 Professor U. Frith (University College London), Psychology
 Professor J. A. Graham-Campbell (University College London), Archaeology
 Professor D. E. Greenway (University of London), History
 Professor A. F. Harding (University of Durham), Archaeology
 Professor James Harris (University of Oxford), Law
 Professor K. T. Hoppen (University of Hull), History
 Professor C. B. Howe (School of Oriental and African Studies, London), Economics
 Professor G. D. Josipovici (University of Sussex), English
 Professor A. T. L. Kuhrt (University College London), Ancient Near Eastern History
 Professor N. M. Lacey (London School of Economics and Political Science), Law
 Professor H. Lee (University of Oxford), English
 Professor D. Lieven (London School of Economics and Political Science), Russian History
 Professor D. N. J. MacCulloch (University of Oxford), History
 Dr I. J. McMullen (University of Oxford), Japanese
 Dr N. R. Malcolm, Early Modern History
 Professor J. Mayall (University of Cambridge), International Relations
 Professor E. C. Page (London School of Economics and Political Science), Public Policy
 Professor J. P. Parry (London School of Economics and Political Science), Anthropology
 Professor S. G. Pulman (University of Oxford), Linguistics
 Professor G. S. Smith (University of Oxford), Russian Literature
 The Revd Professor J. K. S. Ward (University of Oxford), Theology
 Professor A. W. Young (University of York), Psychology

Senior fellows 

 Professor J. Durbin, Statistics
 Professor D. Lowenthal, Geography

2000 
The following fellows of the British Academy were elected at the annual general meeting in 2000:

 Professor R. D. Ashton (University College London), English 
 Professor C. M. Britton (University of Aberdeen), French 
 Professor J. Broome (University of St Andrews), Philosophy 
 Professor D. S. T. Clark (University of Wales Swansea), History 
 Dr S. A. Collini (University of Cambridge), Intellectual History and English Literature 
 Professor J. R. Crawford (University of Cambridge), Law 
 Professor D. Crystal (University of Wales Bangor), Linguistics 
 Professor P. L. Davies (London School of Economics and Political Science), Law 
 Dr D. Gambetta (University of Oxford), Sociology 
 Professor A. M. Gamble (University of Sheffield), Politics 
 Professor C. S. Gamble (University of Southampton), Archaeology 
 Professor H. G. Genn (University College London), Law 
 Professor J. Gray (University of Cambridge), Education 
 Mr A. V. Griffiths (British Museum), Art History 
 Dr P. R. Hardie (University of Cambridge), Classics 
 Professor H. E. Joshi (Institute of Education, University of London), Demography 
 Professor S. D. Keynes (University of Cambridge), History 
 Dr P. F. Kornicki (University of Cambridge), Japanese Studies 
 Professor A. J. Kuper (Brunel University), Anthropology 
 Professor R. C. C. Law (University of Stirling), History 
 Professor A. Leighton (University of Hull), English 
 Professor J. M. Malcomson (University of Oxford), Economics 
 Dr G. Marshall (Economic and Social Research Council), Sociology 
 Professor L. Mulvey (Birkbeck College), Film Studies 
 Professor L. A. Newson (King's College London), Geography 
 The Revd Professor O. M. T. O'Donovan (University of Oxford), Theology 
 Dr A. Offer (University of Oxford), Economic History 
 Professor R. J. Overy (King's College London), History 
 Professor P. M. Robinson (London School of Economics and Political Science), Economics 
 Professor P. E. Rock (London School of Economics and Political Science), Sociology 
 Dr W. F. Ryan (Warburg Institute, University of London), Slavonic Studies 
 Professor T. J. Samson (University of Bristol), Musicology 
 Dr J. D. Teasdale (MRC Cognition and Brain Sciences Unit), Psychology 
 Professor H. S. Wallace (University of Sussex), Political Studies 
 Professor A. Whiten (University of St Andrews), Psychology

References